Mezzetino is an oil on canvas painting in the Metropolitan Museum of Art, New York, by the French Rococo painter Jean-Antoine Watteau. Dated within 1717–1720, Mezzetino forms a full-length single-figure composition, depicting the eponymous character in commedia dell'arte. In the 18th century, Mezzetino was owned by Jean de Jullienne, the friend and patron of Watteau who supervised the four-volume edition of prints after the artist's works, for which the picture was engraved by Benoit Audran the Elder; after Jullienne's death in 1766, it was acquired for the Hermitage in Saint Petersburg, then recently established by Empress Catherine II of Russia. During the Soviet sales in the 1920s and 1930s, Mezzetino was sold to British-American businessman Calouste Gulbenkian; it was later sold to the Wildenstein art firm in Paris and New York, from which it was bought in 1934 by the Metropolitan Museum of Art, where it remains; the institution also owns a preparatory study—a drawing of the man's head.

Mezzetino was a comedy character, based on Harlequin but with his own distinctive costume, who was introduced for the first time by the Théâtre italien de Paris actor Angelo Costantini on October 16, 1683. Constantini's expressive face allowed him to portray the role without a mask, a tradition kept alive by all successive Mezzetinos. That novelty attracted Watteau, who featured Mezzetino in several of his works. In the picture, Mezzetino is playing his guitar and singing, his eyes lifted as if towards an unseen balcony. The statue of Venus behind him is facing away, suggesting that his feelings are not shared by the lady she represents. Although the model for Mezzetino is not known, the fact that Jean de Jullienne, who, while selling a number of Watteau's works through his life, still kept Mezzetino, suggests he may have fulfilled the role.

Provenance

Exhibition history

References

Bibliography

External links
 
 Mezzetin at the Web Gallery of Art

Musical instruments in art
1710s paintings
Paintings by Antoine Watteau
Paintings in the collection of the Metropolitan Museum of Art
Commedia dell'arte